The first USS Tillamook (Tug No. 16), later AT-16, later YT-122, later YTM-122, was a United States Navy tug in service from 1914 to 1947.

Tillamook was laid down on 6 January 1914 by the Seattle Construction and Dry Dock Company at Seattle, Washington and launched on 15 August 1914. She was placed in service soon thereafter, probably later in August or in September 1914, as USS Tillamook (Tug No. 16).

Tillamook steamed south to San Francisco, California, and reported to the Commandant, 12th Naval District, for duty at Mare Island Navy Yard in Vallejo, California. She served her entire 33-year U.S. Navy career towing and assisting ships at Mare Island Navy Yard.

During her service, Tillamook changed designations three times. On 17 July 1920, when the Navy adopted the modern system of alpha-numeric hull designations, she was classified as a fleet tug and redesignated AT-16. On 31 January 1936, a number of old tugs previously classified as fleet tugs were reclassified as harbor tugs, and Tillamook became a harbor tug designated YT-122. She received her final classification, as a medium harbor tug, on 13 April 1944 and was redesignated YTM-122.

Tillamook was placed out of service and turned over to the Maritime Commission for disposal on 28 April 1947.

References

NavSource Online: Service Ship Photo Archive Tillamook (YTM-122) ex Tillamook (YT-122) (1936 - 1944) Tillamook (AT-16) (1920 - 1936) Tillamook (Fleet Tug #16) (1914 - 1920)

Tugs of the United States Navy
World War I auxiliary ships of the United States
World War II auxiliary ships of the United States
Ships built in Seattle
1914 ships